Yves Marie François Le Trocquer ( 4 October 1877 – 21 February 1938) was a French civil engineer, administrator and politician.
After a career in public works projects he became a technical assistant to several government ministers.
He administered the French waterways for military purposes during World War I (1914–18).
He was elected Deputy of Côtes-du-Nord in 1919, and from 1920 to 1924 was Minister of Public Works.
In 1930 he left the Chamber of Deputies for the Senate, where he served for the remainder of his life.

Life

Early years (1877–1910)
Yves Marie François Le Trocquer was born on 4 October 1877 in Pontrieux, Côtes-du-Nord.
When he was two years old his father, a lieutenant in the navy, died on 28 June 1879 aboard the Amiral Charner.
Le Trocquer entered the Ecole polytechnique, and after graduation became a member of the Corps des ponts et chaussées.
He first worked in the ports of Nantes and Saint-Nazaire, then for the Seine department. 
He proved very capable both as a technician and as an administrator, and became a chief engineer at the age of 36.

Government appointments (1910–19)

In 1910 Le Trocquer became technical director of the cabinet of Louis Puech, Minister of Public Works.
He served in the same role in the successive cabinets of Charles Dumont and Victor Augagneur.
He followed Augagneur to the Ministry of Public Education and then the Ministry of the Navy.
During World War I (1914–18) in 1915 he was appointed Director of Military Transport and Operation of Waterways, and Director of the National Board of Navigation.
For the services he rendered in these positions he was made an Officer of the Legion of Honour.
In 1919 he became general director of the cabinet of Jules Cels(fr), Undersecretary of State for the Navy.

Deputy (1919–30)

Le Trocquer was elected Deputy of Côtes-du-Nord on 19 November 1919.
He sat with the Left Republican group.
Soon after being elected Le Trocquer was appointed Undersecretary of State for Liquidation of Stocks in the second cabinet of Georges Clemenceau.

Le Trocquer was next appointed Minister of Public Works in the first cabinet of Alexandre Millerand, and held this position for four and a half years in seven different governments.
He oversaw a major post-war reconstruction of railways, waterways and roads in the liberated regions.
The railway unions had responded to requests for responsibility by the Minister of Public Works in January 1919 by demanding nationalization of the railways, which the railway executives saw as a revolutionary and anarchic demand.
During an early dispute with the railway workers, Le Trocquer supported the railway management.
He said in the Chamber, "I am here to have discipline respected. I shall never commit an act which could have as a consequence the weakening of suspension of sanctions pronounced by responsible chiefs for acts of indiscipline."

Le Trocquer estimated that France needed 70 million tons of coal annually, but 1919 production was around 20 million tons and the war-damaged mines of the north were unable to produce more in the short term.
Requisition of German coal in lieu of reparations was the obvious solution.
In 1922 Le Trocquer warned that in less than ten years Germany would no longer be obliged by treaty to deliver coke.
He called for either taking direct control of state mines in the Ruhr or gaining control of the Ruhr coal industry as reparation.
Le Trocquer was involved in the 1923 occupation of the Ruhr and the rehabilitation of the Saar mines.

Le Trocquer developed the concept of "green coal", by which the water network could be put to the use of Breton industry.
He promoted construction of the Guerlédan dam in 1923, and tried with less success to develop a power plant on the Rance.
He was reelected on 11 May 1924, and sat with the Democratic Republican group.
After leaving the cabinet Le Trocquer continued to be interested in the question of reparations, and participated in a committee of inquiry on this subject.

The French Committee of the European Customs Union (UDE) was constituted on 28 January 1927, headed by Charles Gide and Yves Le Trocquer.
Le Trocquer was reelected on 22 April 1928 and sat with the Radical Left group.
In 1928 Le Trocquet was chairman of the Franco-German liaison committee of French parliamentarians, with Aristide Briand and Joseph Paul-Boncour as honorary convenors. 
After intense lobbying the committee managed to get Germany to create a corresponding committee in 1929 chaired by Joseph Wirth.
Le Troquet wrote in the left-oriented La Volonté that rapprochement with Germany was a step towards the unification of Europe.
On 24 November 1928 the Federal Committee for European Cooperation was formed with Émile Borel as president.
Yves Le Troquet was president of its French committee.
He left the Chamber of Deputies on 30 January 1930 after being elected to the Senate.

Senator (1930–38)

Le Trocquer  was elected Senator of Côtes-du-Nord on 14 January 1930, and held office until his death in 1938.
He was elected at the top of on the list of the Republican and National Union.
He was a member of committees on public works, colonies, Algeria and foreign affairs.
He was often involved in debates on railways, ports, roads, electricity and public utilities, sometimes as rapporteur.
He was also involved in various economic and social issues.
Le Trocquer often travelled abroad, and developed friendships with foreign counterparts.
He became President of the Democratic and Radical Union parliamentary group, and Vice-President of the Democratic Alliance.

Le Trocquer died in Paris on 21 February 1938.
On 4 May 1939 the general council of Côtes-du-Nord granted 5,000 francs to the municipality of Pontrieux for a monument to Le Troquet.
The granite monument to Troquet with a bronze medallion of his head by the sculptor Renaud was inaugurated in the Place Le Trocquer after World War II (1939–45) in a ceremony attended by the deputy René Pleven.

Publications

Publications by Le Trocquer include:

Notes

Sources

1877 births
1938 deaths
People from Côtes-d'Armor
Politicians from Brittany
Democratic Republican Alliance politicians
Independent Radical politicians
French Ministers of Public Works
Transport ministers of France
Members of the 12th Chamber of Deputies of the French Third Republic
Members of the 13th Chamber of Deputies of the French Third Republic
Members of the 14th Chamber of Deputies of the French Third Republic
French Senators of the Third Republic
Senators of Côtes-d'Armor
Collège Stanislas de Paris alumni